Marginella aequinoctialis is a species of sea snail, a marine gastropod mollusk in the family Marginellidae, the margin snails.

This species has not, so far (2017) been formally reassigned to Glabella Swainson, 1840 but belongs there as being a sibling species of Glabella bellii (G.B. Sowerby II, 1846)

Description
The length of the shell attains 10.9 mm.

Distribution
This species occurs in the Atlantic Ocean off Gabon at a depth of 25 m.

References

 Boyer F. & Simbille C., 2004. A propos d'une espèce jumelle de Marginella bellii Sowerby, 1846. Bollettino Malacologico, 40 (5-8): 80-87

aequinoctialis
Gastropods described in 2004